, is a Japanese manga series written and illustrated by Aoi Makino. It began serialization in Shueisha's Ribon magazine in August 2018. As of March 2019, two collected volumes have been released.

Publication
As of March 2019, the series' individual chapters have been collected into two tankōbon volumes.

At New York Comic Con 2019, Viz Media announced that they licensed the series for English publication.

Volume list

Reception
Brittany Vincent of Otaku USA praised the use of gender and social expectations in the story. She also praised the depiction of idol culture in the series and the psychological thriller elements, which she compared to Perfect Blue. Morgana Santilli of Comics Beat felt the artwork and storytelling were typical of shōjo manga, though Santilli nonetheless praised the use of femininity in the story. Lauren Orsini of Forbes compared the story to the 2014 AKB48 handsaw assault and the 2016 Stabbing of Mayu Tomita. She also praised the use of shōjo manga tropes in the story's exploration of femininity.

Accolades

References

External links
 

Drama anime and manga
Japanese idols in anime and manga
Psychological thriller anime and manga
Romance anime and manga
Shōjo manga
Shueisha manga
Viz Media manga